Fabio Fognini chose to not defend his 2009 title.
Alberto Martín defeated Carlos Berlocq 6–3, 6–3 in the final.

Seeds

Draw

Final four

Top half

Bottom half

References
 Main Draw
 Qualifying Draw

AON Open Challenger - Singles
AON Open Challenger
Clay court tennis tournaments
AON